





























References

Lists of country codes